Sheldon Mac (born Sheldon Reeves McClellan; December 21, 1992) is an American professional basketball player for the Gigantes de Carolina of the Baloncesto Superior Nacional (BSN). He played college basketball for the Texas Longhorns and the Miami Hurricanes.

High school career
McClellan attended Bellaire High School under Bruce Glover. As a senior, he averaged 25.6 points, 7.2 rebounds, 5.0 assists and 2.0 steals per game while helping Bellaire to a 20–9 mark and the first round of the Class 5A state playoffs.

College career
McClellan began his collegiate career at Texas. In his freshman year, he averaged 11.2 points per game. He averaged 13.2 points in his sophomore season. After his sophomore season, he elected to transfer to Miami.

In his junior season at Miami, McClellan averaged 14.5 points, 4.7 rebounds, 1.9 assists in 33.6 minutes per game. He was an Honorable Mention All-ACC selection as a junior. McClellan was listed on the Oscar Robertson Award preseason watchlist as well as the Naismith College Player of the Year preseason watchlist. McClellan averaged 16.3 points, 3.2 rebounds, 1.6 assists, 1.0 steals and 0.3 blocks in 32.9 minutes per game as a senior. On March 6, 2016, McClellan was named to the Second-Team All-ACC.

Professional career

Washington Wizards (2016–2018)
After going undrafted in the 2016 NBA draft, McClellan signed with the Washington Wizards on September 23, 2016. He made his debut for the Wizards in their season opener on October 27, 2016, recording seven points and two steals in four minutes off the bench in a 114–99 loss to the Atlanta Hawks. With starting shooting guard Bradley Beal out injured on November 12, 2016 against the Chicago Bulls, McClellan made his first career start and subsequently scored a season-high 15 points in a 106–95 loss. On December 6, 2016, he was assigned to the Delaware 87ers of the NBA Development League, pursuant to the flexible assignment rule. On December 18, 2016, he was recalled by Washington. On April 4, 2017, he was assigned to the Rio Grande Valley Vipers. He was recalled by the Wizards a week later.

In a preseason game on October 8, 2017, Mac suffered a serious injury to his lower left leg, with the Wizards fearing a tear to his left Achilles' tendon. He did not appear in a game for the Wizards in 2017–18, and on February 8, 2018, he was traded to the Atlanta Hawks alongside cash considerations in exchange for a protected 2019 second round draft pick. He was immediately waived by the Hawks upon being acquired.

Canton Charge (2019–2021)
For the 2019–20 season, Mac joined the Canton Charge of the NBA G League. On January 4, 2020, Mac recorded 39 points, five rebounds, five assists, two steals and one block in a 112–111 overtime win over the Fort Wayne Mad Ants.

On March 8, 2020, the Cleveland Cavaliers signed Mac to a 10-day contract. However, the season was suspended due to the COVID-19 pandemic and Mac's deal expired before he appeared in a game for the team.

Mac re-signed with the Charge for the 2020–21 season. He averaged 17.9 points and 3.6 assists per game in G League play.

ESSM Le Portel (2021)
On September 24, 2021, Mac signed with ESSM Le Portel of the French LNB Pro A. He averaged  9.3 points and 1.1 assists per game in seven games. Mac parted ways with the team on November 13.

BCM Gravelines-Dunkerque (2021)
On December 5, 2021, Mac signed with BCM Gravelines-Dunkerque of the LNB Pro A.

Cleveland Charge (2022)
On January 1, 2022, Mac was acquired by the Cleveland Charge via returning player rights.

Stockton Kings (2022)
On January 28, 2022, Mac was traded to the Stockton Kings, in exchange for the rights of Dwayne Sutton.

Atléticos de San Germán / Gigantes de Carolina (2022–present)
On April 9, 2022, Mac signed with Atléticos de San Germán of the Puerto Rican BSN, averaging 22.2 points and 4.6 assists in five games. On May 2, he signed with Gigantes de Carolina. Overall, he averaged a league-high 24.4 points in the 2022 season.

NBA career statistics

Regular season

|-
| style="text-align:left;"|
| style="text-align:left;"|Washington
| 30 || 3 || 9.6 || .400 || .233 || .852 || 1.1 || .5 || .3 || .1 || 3.0
|- class="sortbottom"
| style="text-align:center;" colspan="2"|Career
| 30 || 3 || 9.6 || .400 || .233 || .852 || 1.1 || .5 || .3 || .1 || 3.0

Playoffs

|-
| style="text-align:left;"|2017
| style="text-align:left;"|Washington
| 7 || 0 || 2.4 || .556 || .400 || 1.000 || .3 || .0 || .0 || .0 || 2.0
|- class="sortbottom"
| style="text-align:center;" colspan="2"|Career
| 7 || 0 || 2.4 || .556 || .400 || 1.000 || .3 || .0 || .0 || .0 || 2.0

Personal life
Mac is the son of Angel Johnson and has one brother Justin. In February 2017, McClellan had his name legally changed to Sheldon Mac.

References

External links

 Miami Hurricanes bio

1992 births
Living people
21st-century African-American sportspeople
African-American basketball players
American expatriate basketball people in France
American men's basketball players
Atléticos de San Germán players
Basketball players from Houston
BCM Gravelines players
Canton Charge players
Cleveland Charge players
Delaware 87ers players
ESSM Le Portel players
Miami Hurricanes men's basketball players
Rio Grande Valley Vipers players
Shooting guards
Small forwards
Stockton Kings players
Texas Longhorns men's basketball players
Undrafted National Basketball Association players
Washington Wizards players